Orebić  is a port town and municipality in the Dubrovnik-Neretva county in Croatia. It is located on the Pelješac peninsula on the Dalmatian coast. Orebić is directly across a strait from the town of Korčula, located on the island of the same name. Ferries service the two towns frequently.

It was named after the family who restored the castle inside the fortified settlement in 1586.In 1707, Emperor Joseph granted hereditary nobility to the Orebić family for their 70+ years of service in naval warfare and trade. The original Writ of Nobility is housed in the town's Maritime museum, with Croatian and Latin translations at the Franciscan Monastery. The document describes the sea captains' colorful exploits in defending the Austro-Hungarian empire, Italy, and Spain against France and the Ottoman Empire.  The family's role in the Dalmatian salt trade brought wealth and distinction to Dalmatia. During the 19th century, Orebić had 17 of the most important nautical captains in Austria-Hungary Empire.

Tourism

Tourism is one of the town's main sources of income, especially during the summer months. In the 1960s a large number of non-locals (mostly from larger cities in the then former Yugoslavia) built homes for their summer holidays. In subsequent years, tourists from other European countries have begun visiting, staying either in hotels or in the camp sites located around the town that also cater to camper vans. The town's main beach is at Trstenica. Many locals also rent out rooms or apartments during the high season.

The Franciscan monastery of Our Lady of Angels is a local attraction, along with the Mount of Saint Elijah (Croatian brdo Sv. Ilija) located behind the town which offers a view of the island of Korčula and the Adriatic Sea. There are many sign-posted hiking paths from Orebić and nearby villages that lead to the summit .

Historic sea captains' homes line the waterfront, illustrating the town's heritage. Due to the wealth and importance of the sea captains in Dalmatia, the houses were built on a grand scale and set behind large gardens. Most of the homes in the historic district are still owned by descendants of the sea captains families, even those who returned after many years in diaspora. During the 20th century, these families donated ethnographic artifacts, for display at the Maritime museum and museum at the Franciscan monastery house. At the eastern approach to the town, just before Trstenica beach, Villa Korta Katarina & Winery is a 5 star, luxury boutique villa hotel affiliated with Relais & Chateaux.  It is a desirable destination for people who love fine wine, gourmet food, and spectacular scenery, the winery of the same name produces local varieties such as Pošip and Plavac Mali.

Transport

Orebić is accessible by road and ferry. It is some 90 minutes drive from Dubrovnik and some 3–4 hours drive from Split, both of which are accessed via the Adriatic Highway (European route E65) which is accessed via nearby Ston. The drive from Ston to Orebić passes some of Croatia's largest vineyards including those at Potomje and Postup.

There are ferry connections to Korčula each day from Orebić. The car ferry deposits passengers some 3–4 kilometers from Korčula Town and, therefore, is not suitable for foot passengers. There is also a passenger ferry that deposits passengers directly in Korčula Town. Car ferry tickets must be purchased in advance of boarding the ferry at the Jadrolinija booth near to Splitska Banka. Tickets for the passenger ferry can be purchased when boarding the craft.

From Korčula, there are other ferry services including the main Rijeka-Split-Stari Grad (Hvar)-Korčula-Mljet-Dubrovnik-Bari ferry service operated by Jadrolinija. In addition, there are fast ferry services from Korčula to Dubrovnik and to Hvar Old Town-Split. There are also services to nearby islands such as Badija.

Bus services operate from Orebić to Dubrovnik, Split and Zagreb.

Services and facilities

Orebić has supermarkets (such as Konzum and Studenac), a medical and dental center, newsagents (also selling international newspapers), pharmacies, post office, bakeries, banks, hair salons, building providers, garden centers, bars and restaurants with the majority of services being located along the town's main thoroughfare.

Municipality
According to the 2011 census there were 4,122 residents in the municipality of Orebić, with 94% being Croats. There are a large number of home-owners in the town who do not reside there permanently.

The list of inhabited places in the municipality, and their respective populations:

 Orebić, 1,979
 Viganj, 283
 Kuna Pelješka, 223
 Potomje, 252
 Lovište, 228
 Kućište, 217
 Stanković, 252
 Donja Banda, 149
 , 171
 Pijavičino, 113
 Oskorušno, 101
 Trstenik, 117
 Podobuče, 34
 Nakovanj, 3

The municipality is divided in the following districts:

Sports
NK Orebić

Notable people
Celestin Medović- painter, from village Kuna Pelješka
Piyale Pasha- Ottoman Grand Admiral and Vizier
Zvonimir Roso- criminologist and psychologist, from village Kuna Pelješka
Ivan Tomašević
Jozo Tomasevich-economist and historian, from village Košarni Do
John Mark Totich-new Zealand gum-digger, boarding-house keeper, community leader and consul, from village Kuna Pelješka

Picture gallery

References

External links

 the official website http://www.tz-orebic.hr
 

Municipalities of Croatia
Populated places in Dubrovnik-Neretva County
Populated coastal places in Croatia